Zalewski (feminine: Zalewska, plural: Zalewscy) is a Polish-language surname. Alternate spellings include Zelewski, Zaleski, Zeleski, Zalewska, Zalescy and Zaller.

The form Zalewski is the hypercorrect form of Zaleski. By analogy with other surnames, like Chotomowski (colloquially pronounced as if spelt "Chotomoski"), Olszewski ("Olszeski") etc., it may seem that the shorter spelling must reflect the popular pronunciation and not the older, etymological one, but this is not the case. The original form Zaleski was derived from a place called Zalesie or Zalas, which literally means "an area close to a forest, behind a forest". It is difficult to assess which regions were primarily connected with it, because of the significant number of villages by such names. (Another case of such hypercorrection is Dmowski, derived from Dmochy, not *Dmów or *Dmowo).

Another possible etymology for one of the forms of Zalewski surname comes from a topographic name for someone who lived by a flood plain, bay, or any other small body of water. Two locations that this may be connected to are Zalew in Sieradz voivodeship or Zalewo in Olsztyn voivodeship.

The Germanised version of this surname is Salewski and Saleski, usually found in the Silesia region. 

An early form of this surname was first noted in the year 1370. Many families from different classes and with different background used this surname. Several famous people have the surname Zalewski or a variant of it:

 Anna Zalewska (born 1965), Polish politician
 Aran Zalewski (born 1991), Australian field hockey player
 August Zaleski (1883-1972), Polish politician
 Erich von dem Bach Zelewski (1899-1972), SS-Obergruppenführer
 Karol Zalewski (born 1993), Polish athlete
 Ksawery Zalewski, Polish diplomat, part of the Piłsudski's Prometheism government, worker of consulate in French Lille (1925–1926) and Georgian Tbilisi (1926–1936). Later titular consul in Tbilisi.
 Krystian Zalewski (born 1989), Polish athlete
 Michał Zalewski (born 1981), Polish "White Hat" Hacker, computer security expert
 Nicola Zalewski, Polish footballer

Notes

References

 

Polish-language surnames